Behudin Merdović (born 15 October 1961) is a Serbian speed skater. He competed at the 1984 Winter Olympics and the 1988 Winter Olympics.

References

1961 births
Living people
Serbian male speed skaters
Olympic speed skaters of Yugoslavia
Speed skaters at the 1984 Winter Olympics
Speed skaters at the 1988 Winter Olympics
People from Priboj